Manuel Levins Holden (born September 22, 1989) better known by his stage name Manny Phesto, is an Underground hip hop musician based in Minneapolis, Minnesota. Manny is also an entrepreneur and business owner in the cannabis and CBD space. Pitchfork Media listed his music amongst their "Best MN Hip-Hop Releases".  City Pages named his debut album Southside Looking In one of "The Best Minnesota Rap Albums of 2014". 89.3FM The Current awarded it their "Album of the Year" title XXL magazine also recently jokingly credited him with "getting Action Bronson and Ghostface to agree on one thing." after their recent altercations. The Mexican magazine Me Hace Ruido named him one of their "Artists to Follow".

Career
In 2010, Manny Phesto and a few friends began performing locally at demonstrations, benefit concerts, and small shows at parties and venues such as Acadia Café, and The Madusa.
2011 saw Manny curating his own events at local Italian restaurant Italiani's and playing other hip hop shows around town.

In September 2012, Manny Phesto co-founded and curated a day long hip hop festival in the Cedar Riverside neighborhood of Minneapolis at which he released his Social Capital EP collaboration with Julian Fairbanks. The festival, Hip Hop Harambee ran two consecutive years 2012, 2013 and featured local and national recording artists, dancers, visual artists, producers, and DJs including: Big K.R.I.T., Talib Kweli, Devin The Dude, Shabazz Palaces, Gritty Committee (Greg Grease & Freez), Mike the Martyr, Axel Foley, Metasota, DJ Frank Castle and others.

April 2014 Manny released his Mike the Martyr produced Southside Looking In project online, followed by a release party in June.

In May 2015 Manny Phesto was featured on the bill of the 8th annual Soundset Music Festival  which was named the "Best Hip Hop Festival Around" by MTV". 
Manny was featured on Sway Calloway's Sway in the Morning show on Eminem's Shade 45 channel aired on Sirius XM.

In June 2015 and 2016, Manny Phesto toured four islands of Hawaii on The Intra Island Music Tour He performed at the 26th annual Saturday in the Park headlined by Aretha Franklin
on July 4 in Sioux City, Iowa, and Summer Set Music and Camping Festival in Somerset, Wisconsin. Manny was named one of NoMute.MX's 11 recommendations for Festival Ajusco in Mexico City.

Manny Phesto is the co-founded and co-headlined the HiGH MiNDS Tour (2016), Back in Session (2017) and Breaking Even (2019) tours which toured the United States with fellow Minnesota artists Baby Shel and The Rotation, Cold Sweat, Jantzonia, Ben Buck and others.  Manny Phesto has performed at Fabrica De Arte Cubano and Teatro Karl Marx in Havana, Cuba

In June 2019 Manny released his sophomore full length project Over South produced entirely by TZ1.

Manny's upbringing in a working-class family of artists and activists including Ricardo Levins Morales, Richard Levins, Rosario Morales, and Aurora Levins Morales has influenced recurring themes in his music. He has worked with the Poor People's Economic Human Rights Campaign as a community organizer and was an official endorser of its directors 2012 bid for Vice President on the Green Party ticket.

Marketing
During the 2014 midterm election he launched his "Manny Phesto for Minnesota" campaign in which he was "running" as a write-in candidate for any ballot position where his fans felt he was needed. Manny's yard signs appeared in yards throughout the twin cities. In the years since he has reintroduced the yard sign campaigns with "Manny Phesto for US", and most recently, "Manny Phesto for the People" in May 2019 in support of his new Over South album with producer TZ1.

Manny has gathered "endorsement photos" from artists including Slug of Atmosphere, Immortal Technique, Mystikal, Rittz, Ghostface Killah, Action Bronson, and others. A couple of which were highlighted in this article by XXL. Manny has also adopted a Metro Transit (Minnesota) bus Shelter in Minneapolis.

Discography

EPs
(2012) Social Capital EP

Albums
(2014) Southside Looking In
(2019) Over South

References

External links 
 www.mannyphesto.com
 Manny Phesto on Facebook
 Manny Phesto on Rap Genius
 Manny Phesto on Discogs

Living people
Alternative hip hop musicians
American male rappers
American people of Puerto Rican descent
Hip hop activists
Rappers from Minneapolis
Songwriters from Minnesota
1989 births
21st-century American rappers
21st-century American male musicians
American people of Ukrainian-Jewish descent
American male songwriters